The Japanese 20mm Cannon Blockhouse is one of many relics of World War II on the island of Saipan in the Northern Mariana Islands. It was built in some haste by the Japanese forces defending Saipan in 1944, and was captured by Allied forces early in the Battle of Saipan.

The blockhouse was listed on the National Register of Historic Places in 1995.

See also
National Register of Historic Places listings in the Northern Mariana Islands

References

World War II on the National Register of Historic Places in the Northern Mariana Islands
Buildings and structures on the National Register of Historic Places in the Northern Mariana Islands
Buildings and structures completed in 1944
Blockhouses